The Honda CB360 is a twin cylinder four-stroke motorcycle produced by Honda from 1974 to 1976. It succeeded the Honda CB350 and provided an alternative to the four cylinder CB350F and CB400F. The CB360 was a new design. The 356 cc engine was tuned for broad range torque, and drove the rear wheel through a six-speed gearbox. The base CB360 model was equipped with front and rear drum brakes, while the CB360t version had a front hydraulic disc brake.

References

External links
  Manufacturer specifications

CB360
Motorcycles introduced in 1974
Motorcycles powered by straight-twin engines